The Missiles of October is a 1974 docudrama made-for-television play about the Cuban Missile Crisis in October 1962. The title evokes the 1962 book The Guns of August by Barbara Tuchman about the missteps amongst the great powers and the failed chances to give an opponent a graceful way out, which led to World War I.

The teleplay introduced William Devane as President John F. Kennedy and cast Martin Sheen as Attorney General Robert F. Kennedy. It was broadcast on Wednesday, December 18, 1974. The script was based on Robert Kennedy's posthumously-published 1969 book Thirteen Days: A Memoir of the Cuban Missile Crisis.

Production notes
The title of the play was influenced by the 1962 book The Guns of August by Barbara W. Tuchman, which describes various events leading to World War I and had been read by US President John F. Kennedy shortly before the crisis. In the play, Kennedy compares events in the book to the crisis with the Soviet Union.

Staged as a two-and-a-half hour television play,  the production eschews physical action and detailed sets and wardrobes in favor of emphasis on dialogue, emotion, and decision-making.  The plot depicts how the world came close to the brink of but eventually stepped away from global thermonuclear war and highlights the roles of President Kennedy, US Attorney General Robert F. Kennedy, Soviet Premier Nikita Khrushchev, US Ambassador to the United Nations Adlai Stevenson, and former US Secretary of State Dean Acheson during the crisis.

The Missiles of October gave the US general public its first look behind the scenes at the inner workings, disagreements, and ultimate consensus of the Kennedy administration to blockade Cuba, rather than invade to dislodge the just-discovered partially completed Soviet nuclear missile emplacements in Cuba.  It details US attempts to give the Soviets room to negotiate without appearing to capitulate and periodically depicts Khrushchev reporting progress of the events to his Communist Party cohorts.

Vice-President Lyndon B. Johnson, who was a member of EXCOMM and was present at most meetings during the crisis, is not portrayed in the docudrama.

The play was directed by Anthony Page with writing credits given to Stanley R. Greenberg and Robert Kennedy. The play is noted for Sheen's changing accent throughout the play as well as his several flubbed lines in the first several acts.

Cast
 William Devane as John F. Kennedy, President of the United States
 Martin Sheen as Robert F. Kennedy, Attorney General of the United States
 Howard da Silva as Nikita Khrushchev, Premier of the Soviet Union
 Ralph Bellamy as Adlai Stevenson, US Ambassador to the United Nations
 Michael Lerner as Pierre Salinger, White House Press Secretary
 Clifford David as Theodore Sorensen, White House Counsel
 John Dehner as Dean Acheson, former US Secretary of State
 Nehemiah Persoff as Andrei Gromyko, Soviet Foreign Minister
 Albert Paulsen as Anatoly Dobrynin, Soviet Ambassador to the United States
 Will Kuluva as Valerian Zorin, Soviet Diplomat
 Dana Elcar as Robert McNamara, United States Secretary of Defense
 Larry Gates as Dean Rusk, United States Secretary of State
 William Prince as C. Douglas Dillon, US Secretary of the Treasury
 Keene Curtis as John McCone, Director of the CIA
 James Olson as McGeorge Bundy, US National Security Advisor
 Andrew Duggan as General Maxwell Taylor, Chairman of the Joint Chiefs of Staff
 Robert P. Lieb as Curtis LeMay, Chief of Staff of the US Air Force
 Richard Eastham as David M. Shoup, Commandant of the Marine Corps
 Dennis Patrick as Llewellyn Thompson, Former US Ambassador to the Soviet Union
 Kenneth Tobey as Admiral George W. Anderson Jr., Chief of Naval Operations
 James Hong as U Thant, UN Secretary General
 John Randolph as George Ball, Undersecretary of State
 Wright King as Richard Russell Jr., Senator
 Byron Morrow as J. William Fulbright, Senator
 Francis De Sales as unnamed Republican Senator
 Arthur Franz as Charles A. Halleck, Congressman
 Ron Feinberg as Charles de Gaulle, French President
 Paul Lambert as John A. Scali, ABC News Correspondent
 Doreen Lang as Evelyn Lincoln, President Kennedy's personal secretary
 Harris Yulin as Alexander Fomin, KGB spy
 Stewart Moss as Kenneth O'Donnell, Special Assistant to the President
 James T. Callahan as David Powers, Special Assistant to the President 
 Peter Donat as David Ormsby-Gore, British Ambassador to the United States
 Ted Hartley as unnamed Air Force Major General
 Stacy Keach Sr. as William E. Knox, President of Westinghouse Electric International
 John McMurtry as Russian poet Yevgeny Yevtushenko
 Thayer David as uncredited narrator

Awards
Technical Director Ernie Buttelman won the 1975 Emmy Award for outstanding achievement. There were several other Emmy nominations, including outstanding drama or comedy special, outstanding supporting actor in a comedy or drama special for Ralph  Bellamy, and outstanding writing in an original teleplay for Greenberg. The same year Greenberg won the Humanitas Prize in the 90-minute category.

In 1997, the play won a Producers Guild of America Hall of Fame award.

See also
 Thirteen Days (book), memoirs of the crisis by Robert Kennedy
 Thirteen Days (film), a 2000 retelling of the story with newly declassified information not available in 1974
 Cultural depictions of John F. Kennedy

References

External links
 

1974 television films
1974 films
1974 drama films
Films set in 1962
Films set in Washington, D.C.
Films set in New York City
Films set in Moscow
Films set in Connecticut
Films about the Cuban Missile Crisis
Films about presidents of the United States
American docudrama films
American political thriller films
Films about John F. Kennedy
Cultural depictions of John F. Kennedy
Films about Robert F. Kennedy
Cultural depictions of Robert F. Kennedy
Cultural depictions of Charles de Gaulle
Cultural depictions of Nikita Khrushchev
Films directed by Anthony Page
Films scored by Laurence Rosenthal
1970s American films